The Henriette-Bathily Women's Museum (in French: Musée de la Femme Henriette-Bathily) is a museum which was located on Gorée, an island on the coast of Senegal, across from the House of Slaves museum. In May 2015, it moved to Dakar, at the Place du Souvenir Africain et de la Diaspora (Corniche Ouest).
A project conceived in 1987 by the filmmaker Ousmane William Mbaye, it was opened in 1994 under the direction of Annette Mbaye d'Erneville.

Collections

There were two levels within this colonial residence, built in 1777 during the French colonial period, having belonged to a wealthy signare, Victoria Albis. Until 1962, it was the property of the Angrand family, notably Armand-Pierre Angrand, a descendant of the signare, writer, a mayor of Gorée and the first mayor of colour of Dakar in 1936.

Museum exhibits include common objects from the colonial period, farming tools, musical instruments, pottery, basketry, as well as photographs allowing a better understanding of the daily life of women in the country. The prominent figures of Senegalese women's emancipation are celebrated, for example the novelist Aminata Sow Fall. The building was also previously a courthouse, then the Museum of the Institut fondamental d'Afrique noire which was succeeded in 1966 by Institut Français d'Afrique Noire.

Activities
Workshops were organized there and women of the island gather there to work together, to follow literacy courses, or to receive artisanal training (cloth dyeing, batik, weaving, glass painting, or traditional embroidery).

Specific projects are aimed at disabled women.

Other facilities
The museum has a number of facilities in addition to the artifact displays. It includes an audiovisual room; a boutique; a garden cafe, and an "Espace Culturel et Artisanat" (cultural and artisan space) enabling groups of women from all regions and ethnic backgrounds of Senegal to work at the museum and demonstrate their wide knowledge to visitors. It also provides women with education and training in literacy, civil education, environmental conservation and health education provides training in handicraft techniques. There is a documentation and specialized library service to provide a public databank and research centre.

See also
House of Slaves (Gorée)

References

Bibliography
Annette Mbaye d'Erneville, Le musée de la Femme Henriette-Bathily à Gorée : premier musée privé au Sénégal, p. 1; The Henriette Bathily Museum of Women's History, Gorée: the first private museum in Senegal, p. 5, Bulletin du WAMP (West African Museums Programme), n° 7, 1997.
Jean Luc Angrand, Céleste ou le temps des Signares (Editions Anne Pépin, 2006).

External links

Official website
Musée Henriette Bathily: Le défi de la visibilité (article in Le Quotidien, 8 June 2006)
Musée de la Femme Henriette Bathily. Un projet d'insertion pour les femmes défavorisées (article of Karo Diagne in Le Soleil)
Rencontre des femmes écrivains à Gorée: Aminata Sow Fall donnée en exemple à la nouvelle génération (article of Idrissa Sane in Le Soleil (Senegal)

Houses completed in 1777
Museums established in 1994
Museums in Senegal
Local museums
Women's museums
Women's organisations based in Senegal
1994 establishments in Senegal
History of women in Senegal